Syria competed at the 2004 Summer Olympics in Athens, Greece, from 13 to 29 August 2004.

Medalists

Athletics

Syrian athletes have so far achieved qualifying standards in the following athletics events (up to a maximum of 3 athletes in each event at the 'A' Standard, and 1 at the 'B' Standard).

Men
Field events

Women
Track & road events

Boxing

Syria sent a single boxer to Athens.

Judo

Syria has qualified a single judoka.

Shooting 

Syria has qualified a single shooter.

Men

Swimming

Syrian swimmers earned qualifying standards in the following events (up to a maximum of 2 swimmers in each event at the A-standard time, and 1 at the B-standard time):

Men

See also
 Syria at the 2004 Summer Paralympics
 Syria at the 2005 Mediterranean Games

References

External links
Official Report of the XXVIII Olympiad
Syria Olympic Committee 

Nations at the 2004 Summer Olympics
2004
Olympics, Summer